Robert Dudley Murray (May 16, 1914 – January 15, 1989) was a Canadian tennis player.

A native of Montreal, Quebec, Murray won three intercollegiate team championships with McGill University. In 1935 he became the first Canadian win an international title, beating Ian Collins in the final of the Scottish Championships. He was Canada's top ranked player in 1937 and was runner-up at the Canadian Championships that year to American Walter Senior in five sets. In 1938 he played a Davis Cup tie for Canada against Japan in Montreal.

In World War II, Murray fought with the Canadian forces in Normandy and later served as a special staff observer, attached to the U.S. Marine Corps in Hawaii. He didn't return to the tour after the war.

Murray was a 1994 inductee into the Canadian Tennis Hall of Fame.

See also
List of Canada Davis Cup team representatives

References

External links
 
 
 

1914 births
1989 deaths
Canadian male tennis players
Tennis players from Montreal
McGill University alumni
Canadian military personnel of World War II